The Mikoyan MiG-29M (NATO reporting name: Fulcrum-E) is a Russian multirole fighter developed in 2005. It is based on unified platform together with Mikoyan MiG-29K. The predecessor of the MiG-29M was designed by Mikoyan Design Bureau in the Soviet Union during the mid-1980s and was known as "MiG-33" during the 1990s.

Development
In the mid-1980s, a development of the original MiG-29 was proposed to meet the Soviet western frontline requirement. It was required to be a multirole fighter for the frontline defensive air force to gain offensive strike ability. This development resulted in a single-seat and a two-seat variant. The proposal was then grounded as a result of shifts in military strategy. The model was named "MiG-33" and later received the MiG-29ME designation for the export market in the mid-1990s. A two-seat model of the standard, commonly known as the MiG-29MRCA, was the MAPO-MiG's primary contender for many international fighter aircraft bids, later evolved into the Mikoyan MiG-35. Six of these models were built before 1990. They were constantly upgraded with various components and one received experimental vector thrust engines which eventually became the MiG-29OVT. 

Current model with designation MiG-29M is developed as land variant of MiG-29K with whom it shares avionic and other components and now belongs to the "new unified family" instead of the "MiG-29 fighters family" which comprise the older variants. MiG-29M2 represents two–seat variant of MiG-29M.

MiG-33

During the early 1990s, it became briefly popular for Sukhoi and Mikoyan to assign new designations for upgraded models to make them appear "new and improved" instead of just "improved". The VVS did not accept these marketing designations and most were soon dropped. Following Sukhoi's initiative in this approach, Mikoyan's first such offering was the MiG-29ME, which first publicly appeared as the MiG-33 at the 1994 Farnborough Airshow. The MiG-29ME was the export version of the MiG-29M (Product 9.15) "Super Fulcrum", a comprehensively upgraded, fully multirole version of the MiG-29.

Although the MiG-33 designation was soon dropped, the MiG-29M may have merited a new designation in that it is in many ways a thoroughly redesigned version of the MiG-29. While external differences are few, the MiG-29M was a fully "multifunctional" fighter capable of performing air-to-ground combat with precision-guided munitions (PGMs), along with air-to-air roles of earlier MiG-29 versions. Pilot-aircraft interfaces in the cockpit were also improved and a wide range of new-generation equipment installed. The aircraft's internal fuel capacity was also increased to add combat range.

Procurement
In November 2013, it was reported that Egypt and Russia were negotiating an order of 24 MiG-29M/M2s for the Egyptian Air Force. In April 2015, Egypt became the first export customer when it signed a $2 billion contract for the purchase of 46 MiG-29M/M2 multi-role fighters On 26 October it was reported that Algeria become second country outside Russia to procure the MiG-29M. In March 2021 there were talks between Argentina and Russia regarding the purchase of MiG-29M and MiG-35.

Design

The MiG-29M/M2 aircraft is a revision of the basic MiG-29. It achieved a more multi-role capability with enhanced use of air-to-air and air-to-ground high-precision weapons. It also featured a considerably increased combat range, owing to an increase in its internal fuel capacity.

A few changes took place during the aircraft's development. The redesigned airframe was constructed from a lightweight Aluminium-lithium alloy to increase the thrust-to-weight ratio. The air intake ramps' geometry was revised, the upper intake louvers were removed to make way for more fuel in the LERXs, mesh screens introduced to prevent foreign object damage (FOD) and inlet dimensions were enlarged for higher airflow.

The aircraft is built with an inflight-refueling (IFR) probe and is able to carry three fuel drop tanks. The redesigned airframe also significantly increased internal fuel capacity in the dorsal spine and LERXs fuel tanks. These give the single-seat aircraft an operational range of 2,000 km with internal fuel, 3,200 km with three fuel drop tanks, and 6,000 km with three drop tanks and inflight refueling.

Powerplant
The RD-33MK, the latest revision of the RD-33, has 7% more power in comparison to the baseline model due to the use of modern materials on the cooled blades, and provides a thrust of 9,000 kgf. In response to longtime criticism, the new engines are smokeless and contain improvements that reduce its infrared visibility. Thrust vectoring nozzles are now offered upon customer's request. Dry weight is 1,145 kilograms (2,520 lb) compared to the baseline model through modern materials used on the cooled blades, although it retains the same length and maximum diameter. Incorporated is an infrared and optical signature visibility reduction system. Service life has been increased to 4,000 hours.

Sensors
Main upgrades consist of the Zhuk-ME pulse-Doppler airborne radar, along with revised IRST systems, a helmet-mounted target designation system and electronic countermeasures. According to PHAZOTRON's product brochure, new radar is capable of detecting air targets at ranges up to 80 km, track-while-scan of ten targets, track four targets and attack two targets at a time.

Operational history

Egypt
Egypt signed a contract for 46 MiG-29M/M2 in April 2015, with deliveries to be completed by 2020. The Egyptian variant is designated as the MiG-29M (9.41SM) for the single seater, and MiG-29M2 (9.47SM) for the two seater. They are in many aspects similar to the MiG-35, which was first displayed in Lukhovitsy in January 2017.

The Egyptian MiG's include the upgraded RD-33MK smokeless engines, Zhuk-ME pulse-doppler radar, latest OLS-UE electro-optical targeting station, which feeds both TV and IR imagery to the cockpit display and includes a laser rangefinder, unlike previous IRSTs installed on MiG-29s that only featured IR imagery, and the T220/e targeting pod, allowing the utilization of precision-guided munitions, as well as unguided bombs with a low circular error probability. For electronic warfare purposes, the aircraft will be supplied with the MSP-418K active jammer pod which uses DRFM technology to spoof radar-guided missiles. The pod was previously displayed at MAKS air shows and is yet to enter service with the Russian Air Force.

The country received its first batch of MiG-29M/M2s in April 2017, and by the end of the year had 15 aircraft in its inventory. A proposed modernization is intended to follow in 2020, providing refinements to the airborne radar, software and other avionics. The Egyptian Air Force is expected to keep its MiG-29Ms in service until 2060.

On 3 November 2018, an Egyptian Air Force MiG-29Ms crashed due to a technical malfunction when on a routine training flight. Pilot ejected safely.

Syria
The Syrian Air Force reportedly agreed to buy 24 MiG-29M/M2s in 2012. In July 2012 at the Farnborough Air Show, Russia announced it would not deliver weapons, including combat aircraft, to Syria due to the ongoing Syria Civil War. On 31 May 2013, RSK MiG's director general, Sergei Korotkov, stated that the company plans to sign a contract with Syria to deliver "more than 10" MiG-29 M/M2 and that a Syrian delegation was in Moscow to discuss terms and deadlines of a new contract supplying fighter jets to Syria. At the end of May 2020, a batch of MiG-29 of unknown version has been delivered.

Serbia
The Serbian Air Force intended to buy several MIG-29M/M2s to replace its aging MiG-21 fleet. In 2013, media reports indicated that Serbia planned to purchase six MiG-29M/M2 fighters. Instead of buying MiG-29M in October 2017, Russia donated six used MiG-29 fighters to the Serbian Air Force, with Serbia paying to upgrade them.

Algeria
Algeria procured 14 MiG-29M/M2 according to a contract signed in 2019 during the international military fair MAKS. Deliveries started in October 2020.

Variants
MiG-29M / MiG-33 (Product 9.15)
Advanced single-seat multi-role variant, with a redesigned airframe, mechanical flight controls replaced by a fly-by-wire system and powered by enhanced RD-33 ser.3M engines. NATO reporting code is 'Fulcrum-E'.

MiG-29UBM (Product 9.61)
Two-seat training variant of the MiG-29M. Never built. Effectively continued under the designation 'MiG-29M2'.

MiG-29M2 / MiG-29MRCA
Two-seat version of MiG-29M. Identical characteristics to MiG-29M, with a slightly reduced ferry range of 1,800 km. RAC MiG presented in various air shows, to name a few, Fifth China International Aviation and Aerospace Exhibition (CIAAE 2004), Aero India 2005, and MAKS 2005. It was once given the MiG-29MRCA designation for marketing purposes and has evolved into the MiG-35. The MiG-29M2's number of the hardpoints increased to nine and maximum external payload increased to 6,500 kg, depends on type of equipment and armament.

Operators

Algerian Air Force – 14 MiG-29M/M2s.

Egyptian Air Force – 46 MiG-29M/M2s ordered in 2015, with all in service as of 2020.

Russian Aerospace Forces
 Russian Air Force – 10 MiG-29M2s in service.

Specifications (MiG-29M)

See also

References
Citations

Bibliography
 
 Gordon, Yefim and Peter Davison. Mikoyan Gurevich MiG-29 Fulcrum. Specialty Press, 2005. .
 Lake, John. Jane's How to Fly and Fight in the Mikoyan MiG-29. (HarperCollins, 1997. )

External links

 MiG-29M/M2 and MiG-29SMT, upgraded MiG-29UB pages on the official Russian Aircraft Corporation MiG site
 MiG-29M/M2 on globalsecurity.org

MiG-029M
1980s Soviet fighter aircraft
Twinjets

Twin-tail aircraft